Yossi Feldman is an Australian rabbi. He ran the Yeshiva Centre in Sydney with his father, Pinchus Feldman. He has been the subject of numerous high-profile controversies in the Jewish community, specifically the cover up of child sex abuse.

Controversies

Royal Commission 
Feldman was called as a witness during the Royal Commission into Institutional Responses to Child Sexual Abuse.

While on the stand, he said that he did not know as a fact that it was illegal for an adult to touch the genitals of a child. At the time he was the dean of the Yeshivah Gedola Rabbinical College, a position he eventually resigned.

He claimed that rabbis should be able to determine themselves whether to pass claims of abuse on to the police, or to deal with them privately.

In his testimony, Felman spoke about a letter he wrote to the Sydney Beth Din, objecting to their stance encouraging victims of abuse to talk to police. Feldman was concerned that this would have implications for his friend, David Cyprys. Cyprys was later jailed on charges of sexually abusing boys in Melbourne.

He assisted another abuser to escape Australia not long after he discovered that an accusation was taken to the police.

Following the backlash from his appearance at the Royal Commission, Feldman attacked the media saying that their reporting "encourages even people who may not be real victims or may want to be considered heroes".

An editorial in Australian Jewish News called his testimony "our darkest week" as a community and singled out Feldman and his father for particular condemnation. The editorial claimed that it had not seen an improvement in culture from the period when the abuse occurred. Feldman's testimony was widely condemned across the community.

He later resigned from his positions.

Feldman threatened to sue news organisations over their reporting of his testimony. The International Business Times withdrew their reporting and apologized. In addition, Australian Jewish News, The Guardian, The Herald Sun, The Daily Telegraph, The Australian, ABC, SBS, The Daily Beast, the Council of Orthodox Synagogues of Australasia, The Executive Council of Australian Jewry and The New South Wales Jewish Board of Deputies were all threatened with legal action over their reporting.  On 31 January 2020 the judgement by Feldman against Nationwide News, Herald and Weekly Times, the Special Broadcasting Corporation and individual journalists in the Supreme Court of NSW was made for the case heard in May and August 2018.  Judgments were made against the plaintiff (Feldman) and  defendants’ costs awarded to him.

Other controversies 
In June 2013, Feldman was ordered to pay a former employee, Rabbi Shabsi Tayar, $1.6 million. The amount was due to his failure to repay a $1 million loan and to pay wages. Tayar was described as on the verge of bankruptcy and was forced to live with family in Melbourne since he could not afford rent.

In 2015 he resigned as a director of the Yeshiva Centre to as part of an agreement to settle an outstanding bill of $10,000 relating for commercial waste removal.

Feldman was providing a rival kosher certification to the mainstream Kashrut Authority, but resigned from that position following the Royal Commission. When he initially provided the certification the NSW Rabbinical Council voted 18–3 against Feldman. Following this vote Feldman, a former president of the organisation, resigned.

Removal from Yeshiva Centre 
Following financial difficulties, businessman Harry Triguboff purchased the Yeshiva Centre and leased it back to the Feldmans for a peppercorn rent. Triguboff later regretted renting the premises to them, and handed control of the organisation to Rabbi Dovid Slavin. Feldman took Triguboff to court where he lost and was forced to vacate the premises.

In response Feldman sent a letter to Triguboff stating that the centre would be shut down "out of hatred" and that Triguboff was "about to commit one of the biggest sins possible of degrading and humiliating a Talmid Chochom [Torah scholar]". He also claimed that "you’ll be – not because of lack of money – the first Jew to close a Shule since the Nazis, communists and terrorist Palestinians".

Family 
Feldman's father, Pinchus, was the head of the Sydney Chabad institutions in Sydney for many years.

Feldman's grandfather, Chaim Gutnick was a high-profile rabbi in Melbourne. He has a number of high-profile uncles, including mining magnate Joseph Gutnick, senior rabbi on the Sydney Beth Din Moshe Gutnick, and the senior rabbi on the Melbourne Beth Din, Mordechai Gutnick. His uncle, Joseph had provided money to the synagogue and was in a legal dispute with the Feldman family when he attempted to sell the synagogue site to developers.

See also

Judaism in Australia

References 

Australian Hasidic rabbis
21st-century Australian rabbis
Chabad-Lubavitch rabbis
Year of birth missing (living people)
Living people